Tseng Chih-wei (born 2 November 1991) is a Taiwanese footballer who currently plays as a forward at the national and club level.

International goals
.''Scores and results are list Taiwan's goal tally first.

References

1991 births
Living people
Taiwanese footballers
Chinese Taipei international footballers
Tatung F.C. players
Association football forwards
People from Pingtung County